Wareham was a parliamentary borough in Dorset, which elected two Members of Parliament (MPs) to the House of Commons from 1302 until 1832, and then one member from 1832 until 1885, when the borough was abolished.

History
The borough consisted of the town of Wareham on the Isle of Purbeck, a market town close to Poole Harbour. In 1831, the population of the borough was 1,676, and it contained 364 houses.

The right to vote was exercised by the Mayor, magistrates and freemen of the town and all inhabitants paying scot and lot; the number who were qualified to vote under this provision by the time of the Reform Act was unknown, as there had not been a contested election for many years, but there were about 500 in the 1760s. In the early 18th century a number of wealthy local families were influential over the choice of members, but eventually John Calcraft of Kingstone Hall secured total control by buying up all the property in the borough occupied by potential voters.

Wareham retained one of its two MPs under the Reform Act, but its boundaries were extended to include several surrounding areas, including nearby Corfe Castle which had previously been a borough in its own right. The new borough had a population of 5,751.

The borough continued to elect one MP until the third Reform Act, which came into effect at the general election of 1885. This abolished the constituency, Wareham being placed in the new East Dorset county division.

Members of Parliament

1302–1629

 Constituency created (1302)

1640–1832

1832–1885

Election results

Elections in the 1830s

Elections in the 1840s

Elections in the 1850s

Elections in the 1860s

Calcraft's death caused a by-election.

Elections in the 1870s

Elections in the 1880s

Notes

References 
D Brunton & D H Pennington, Members of the Long Parliament (London: George Allen & Unwin, 1954)
Cobbett's Parliamentary history of England, from the Norman Conquest in 1066 to the year 1803 (London: Thomas Hansard, 1808) 
 F W S Craig, "British Parliamentary Election Results 1832–1885" (2nd edition, Aldershot: Parliamentary Research Services, 1989)
 Maija Jansson (ed.), Proceedings in Parliament, 1614 (House of Commons) (Philadelphia: American Philosophical Society, 1988)
 J Holladay Philbin, Parliamentary Representation 1832 – England and Wales (New Haven: Yale University Press, 1965)
Henry Stooks Smith, The Parliaments of England from 1715 to 1847 (2nd edition, edited by FWS Craig – Chichester: Parliamentary Reference Publications, 1973)
 
 Concise Dictionary of National Biography (1930)

Parliamentary constituencies in Dorset (historic)
Constituencies of the Parliament of the United Kingdom established in 1302
Constituencies of the Parliament of the United Kingdom disestablished in 1885
Wareham, Dorset